Rhine is a town in Dodge County, Georgia, United States. The population was 394 at the 2010 census.

History 
A post office called Rhine was established in 1890. The community was named after the Rhine river, in Germany, the native land of a large share of the first settlers. The Georgia General Assembly incorporated Rhine as a town in 1891.

Geography

Rhine is located in southern Dodge County at  (31.989696, -83.198762). U.S. Route 280 passes through the town, leading west  to Abbeville and east  to Milan. Georgia State Route 117 crosses US 280 in the center of Rhine, leading north  to Eastman, the Dodge County seat, and southeast  to Jacksonville, Georgia.

Demographics

As of the census of 2000, there were 422 people, 183 households, and 114 families residing in the town. The racial makeup of the town was 67.54% White, 32.23% African American, and 0.24% from two or more races. Hispanic or Latino of any race were 0.95% of the population.

There were 183 households, out of which 27.3% had children under the age of 18 living with them, 36.6% were married couples living together, 21.3% had a female householder with no husband present, and 37.7% were non-families. 35.0% of all households were made up of individuals, and 18.0% had someone living alone who was 65 years of age or older.  The average household size was 2.31 and the average family size was 2.95.

In the town, the population was spread out, with 25.8% under the age of 18, 5.9% from 18 to 24, 23.9% from 25 to 44, 25.4% from 45 to 64, and 19.0% who were 65 years of age or older.  The median age was 40 years. For every 100 females, there were 70.2 males.  For every 100 females age 18 and over, there were 67.4 males.

The median income for a household in the town was $19,107, and the median income for a family was $34,750. Males had a median income of $28,281 versus $21,458 for females. The per capita income for the town was $14,204.  About 16.5% of families and 24.1% of the population were below the poverty line, including 19.4% of those under age 18 and 36.0% of those age 65 or over.

Cultural reference
Rhine gets mentioned in Tracy Byrd's song Watermelon Crawl as the place where the annual watermelon festival takes place.

References

Towns in Dodge County, Georgia
Towns in Georgia (U.S. state)